Stanley Hubert Mauldin (December 27, 1920 – September 24, 1948) was an American football offensive tackle who played professionally in the National Football League (NFL) for the Chicago Cardinals. He died of a heart attack  after a game against the Philadelphia Eagles in 1948. His number 77 is retired by the Cardinals. This cause of death is disputed by direct family members, as later accounts from Cardinal team members say he was accidentally kicked in the back of the skull during the course of the game, causing him to die of internal bleeding. He left behind a wife, Helen Hall Mauldin, and two boys, Richard D Mauldin, and Stanley Jr Mauldin.

Military service 
Stanley Mauldin was also a World War 2 Veteran, serving in the Army Air Corps. He flew 35 missions overseas in World War II. In 1945, he was named to the All-Army Air Force Eleven.

Sports Honors 

 Named to the All-Army Air Force Eleven
 Member of the winning team, the Chicago Cardinals, in the NFL Championship in 1947.
 His NFL jersery number 77 is retired by the Cardinals organization
 Named "Outstanding Athlete" in 1942 by The University of Texas
 Inducted into the University of Texas Longhorn Hall of Honor in 1969
 Playing for Amarillo High School in the Texas Panhandle region, he was named "All-State" as a Center and Linebacker in 1938 
 Inductee #12 for the Texas Panhandle Sports Hall of Fame

Notable Family and Relatives 
 Bill Mauldin (World War Two cartoonist)

References

External links

 

1920 births
1948 deaths
American football tackles
Chicago Cardinals players
Texas Longhorns football players
Sports deaths in Illinois
Amarillo High School alumni
Sportspeople from Amarillo, Texas
Players of American football from Texas
National Football League players with retired numbers